Prognathodes brasiliensis, the Brazilian butterflyfish, the is a species of marine ray-finned fish, a butterflyfish belonging to the family Chaetodontidae. It is found in Brazil.

References

Gasparini, J.L. and S.R. Floeter, 2001. The shore fishes of Trindade Island, western South Atlantic. J. Nat. Hist. 35:1639-1656.

Fauna of Brazil
brasiliensis
Endemic fauna of Brazil
Taxa named by Warren E. Burgess
Fish described in 2001